"Sure Thing" is a song by American recording artist Miguel. Written by himself and produced by Happy Perez, the song is included on his debut album, All I Want Is You (2010). It was first leaked onto YouTube in 2008. It was sent to radio as the album's second single in January 2011. The R&B song features neo soul influences, and had been noted for its similarities to the work of singer Jon B.

It has thus far achieved moderate success in the United States but has since atopped on the US R&B charts. "Sure Thing" marks Miguel's first number-one hit on the Billboard Hot R&B/Hip-Hop Songs chart and was his most successful single to date, until he released the single "Adorn" (2012), spending over fifty weeks on the chart. As of July 2013, the song has sold 1,106,000 copies in the United States.

Following resurgence in streaming due to its growing use on TikTok, the song over ten years after its initial release has started charting worldwide as a global sleeper hit, reaching new peaks or debuting in several countries, including the United Kingdom, where it reached number four, becoming his first top ten single in the region. Furthermore, the song re-entered the Billboard Hot 100, eventually reaching a new peak of 28.

Music and lyrics
Lyrically, Miguel uses analogies to express his love interest, such as "You are the chalk / And I could be your blackboard" and "If I'm the lyric baby / You could be the note".

Music video
The music video premiered on January 17, 2011, was directed by Hype Williams and was shot in Honolulu, Hawaii.

Remix
The official remix features rapper Pusha T.

Lil Wayne released a remix of the single on his Sorry 4 the Wait mixtape on July 13, 2011.

Charts

Weekly charts

Year-end charts

Decade-end charts

Certifications

Release history

References

2011 singles
Miguel (singer) songs
Music videos directed by Hype Williams
2010 songs